Erdao District is one of seven districts of the prefecture-level city of Changchun, the capital of Jilin Province, Northeast China. It borders Jiutai to the north and east, Shuangyang District to the south, Nanguan District to the southwest, Kuancheng District to the northwest, as well as the prefecture-level city of Jilin to the southeast.

Administrative divisions
There are seven subdistricts, two towns, and three townships.

Subdistricts:
Heshun Subdistrict, Dongsheng Subdistrict, Rongguang Subdistrict, Jilin Subdistrict, Dongzhan Subdistrict, Yuanda Subdistrict, Balibao Subdistrict

Towns:
Sandao, Quannongshan

Townships:
Yingjun Township, Sijia Township, Quanyan Township

References

External links

County-level divisions of Jilin
Changchun